Maebe A. Girl (also known as G. Pudlo; born July 27, 1986) is an American drag queen and politician. She came to prominence as the first drag queen ever elected to public office in the United States, due to being elected to the Silver Lake Neighborhood Council in 2019. Girl is non-binary and uses she/her and they/them pronouns.

On June 28, 2019, Girl announced a Democratic Party bid for California's 28th congressional district, challenging incumbent Adam Schiff. If successful, Girl would have been the first transgender person ever elected to Congress. She conceded the election on March 27, 2020, when the final results from Los Angeles County races were released, after placing third.

On February 2, 2021, Girl announced that she would run against Schiff again in the 2022 election. Girl placed second in the June 2022 jungle primary and advanced to the general election, becoming the first Democrat running against Schiff to do so. After Schiff announced that he would retire from the House of Representatives to run for Senate in 2024, Girl announced her candidacy for his seat a third time to succeed him.

Early life and drag career
Girl was born in Pittsburgh. She subsequently moved to Chicago, where she did pizza tours of the city. Girl later began performing in drag. As host and producer of the Lyric Hyperion Theatre's drag brunch, she became known for doing satirical impressions of political figures, including Melania Trump, Betsy DeVos, and Sarah Sanders.

Career

Silver Lake Neighborhood Council 
After working as an overnight supervisor at a homeless shelter, Girl declared a run for the Silver Lake Neighborhood Council on the basis of addressing the homelessness crisis, supporting LGBTQIA rights, and protecting immigrants. Girl ran for Neighborhood Council with a slate of candidates called Silver Lake Progressive. She was elected in the election on April 16, 2019, becoming the first known drag queen ever elected to public office.

After her election, Girl formed the Silver Lake LGBTQIA Advocates Committee. She soon took on the position on the council of Homelessness Liaison, aiming to bridge the gap between the Homelessness Committee and the rest of the council. As part of this homeless advocacy work, she voted in favor of submitting a Community Impact Statement to Los Angeles City Hall to address homeless encampment clean-ups.

2020 congressional election
Girl announced on June 28, 2019 that they would be challenging Adam Schiff in the March 3, 2020 primary election for California's 28th congressional district. They said their goal for policy-making was in three parts: "Protect, Advocate, and Legislate". Girl decided to run as a Democrat, challenging Schiff from the left, and receiving the endorsement of progressive groups, including the local branches of Our Revolution.

2022 congressional election 
Girl ran against Adam Schiff for a second time in the 2022 United States House of Representatives elections for California's 30th congressional district, to which Schiff had been redistricted. She advanced to the general election, finishing second in the primary with 12.9%. Girl lost against Schiff in the general election, bringing in 28.9% of the vote.

2024 congressional election 
Girl announced her candidacy for California's 30th congressional district on January 26, 2023. This came after Adam Schiff, the current incumbent, announced his plans to run for Senate, leaving the congressional district without an incumbent.

Political positions
Girl considers herself a progressive, and has likened her policies to those of Bernie Sanders and Alexandria Ocasio-Cortez. Her policies are strongly pro-LGBTQIA. She has said that dressing in drag is "part of who [she is] as a queer person" and is itself political, saying it "taught [her] how to engage with people". Sitting on the Silver Lake Neighborhood Council's Homelessness Committee, Girl has highlighted homelessness in her campaign and tied it to the high number of homeless LGBTQ youth (40% of total homeless youth identify this way). She supports Medicare for All, a Green New Deal, and abortion rights.

Girl opposes going to war with Iran, Saudi Arabian-led intervention in Yemen, and increases in defense spending. She has repeatedly expressed support for the abolition of ICE.

Electoral history

References

1986 births
21st-century American politicians
American drag queens
California Democrats
California city council members
Candidates in the 2020 United States elections
Candidates in the 2022 United States House of Representatives elections
Entertainers from Pennsylvania
American LGBT city council members
Living people
Non-binary drag performers
People from Silver Lake, Los Angeles
Politicians from Pittsburgh
Transgender politicians
Transgender drag performers
Transgender non-binary people
Non-binary politicians
Candidates in the 2024 United States House of Representatives elections